The yellow-streaked warbler (Phylloscopus armandii) is a species of leaf warbler (family Phylloscopidae). It was formerly included in the "Old World warbler" assemblage.

It breeds across much of China and migrates south to Yunnan and northern Southeast Asia. Its natural habitat is temperate forests.

References

yellow-streaked warbler
Birds of China
yellow-streaked warbler
Taxonomy articles created by Polbot